Napaeus isletae is a species of air-breathing land snail, a terrestrial pulmonate gastropod mollusk in the family Enidae. This species is endemic to Spain.
Endemic fauna of the Canary Islands

References

Enidae
Endemic molluscs of the Iberian Peninsula
Endemic fauna of Spain
Gastropods described in 1992
Taxonomy articles created by Polbot